ABP may refer to:

Companies
 ABP Induction Systems, a global industrial firm
 Associated British Ports, port operator in the UK
 Ananda Publishers, or ABP Pvt. Ltd., an India-based publishing firm and media group
 Au Bon Pain, a fast-casual bakery/cafe chain
 Stichting Pensioenfonds ABP, a European pension fund for government workers in the Netherlands
 ABP Group, Indian media conglomerate
 Advanced Business Park, former redeveloper of Royal Albert Dock, London.

Organizations
 Afghan Border Police
 American Board of Pediatrics, US certifying board for Pediatrics and several of its sub-specialties
 Associated Baptist Press, a religious news agency
 An Bord Pleanála, Ireland, rules on planning appeals

Medicine and biology
 Ambulatory blood pressure, a method to monitor blood pressure
 Arterial blood pressure, the blood pressure in the arteries
 Androgen-binding protein, a glycoprotein
 Actin-binding protein, proteins which attach to the protein actin
Animal by-products

Technology
 Adblock Plus, blocks ads, trackers etc. 
 Alternating bit protocol, a data link layer network protocol

Sport
 Athlete biological passport, an electronic record used to detect anti-doping rule violations in athletes

Other uses
 Alton B. Parker, American judge and Democratic nominee for President in 1904
 Amagi Brilliant Park, an anime series
 Atkamba Airport, in Atkamba, Papua New Guinea
 AB Pacense, a Spanish basketball team based in Badajoz
 Abellen language, a Sambalic language of the Philippines
 Apostolic Bible Polyglot
 The title of Archbishop (as a written abbreviation)
 Alaskan Bush People, a Discovery Channel show with three seasons
 Assumption-based planning, a post-planning method in project management